The Men's 400 Individual Medley swimming event at the 25th SEA Games was held on December 10, 2009. This even was swum as a timed-final (i.e. swimmers only swam the race once).

Results

Final

References

Swimming at the 2009 Southeast Asian Games